Úherce refers to the following places in the Czech Republic:

 Úherce (Louny District)
 Úherce (Plzeň-North District)